Mike Reed (born May 26, 1974) is an American jazz drummer, bandleader, composer and music presenter.

Career
Reed was born in Bielefeld, Germany, in 1974, but raised in Evanston, Illinois north of Chicago. He returned to Chicago in the 1990s after majoring in English and psychology at the University of Dayton in Ohio. He played with David Boykin Expanse, Rob Mazurek's Exploding Star Orchestra, and the Josh Berman Quartet. He leads the quintet Loose Assembly and the quartet People, Places & Things, with whom he recorded several albums on the 482 Music label.

In 2000 he and cornetist Josh Berman started the Sunday Transmission music series at the Hungry Brain bar in Chicago in 2000. He helped start Downtown Sound music series, a free weekly concert program in Chicago's Millennium Park that has included indie rock, world music, and contemporary soul. He is a founding director of the Pitchfork Music Festival and joined the committee that programs the annual Chicago Jazz Festival. Since 2013 he has been the founder and director of the Constellation performing arts venue in Chicago, originally as its for-profit (nominally) owner and then, from 2018, as its nonprofit organization president. Then in 2016 he bought and reopened the nearby Hungry Brain bar, which had closed in 2014, continuing to present live music there into early 2020. He is a member of the Association for the Advancement of Creative Musicians (AACM) in Chicago and served as vice-chair between 2009 and 2011.

In 2009 while on their European tour, the four members of Reed's band People, Places, and Things - two of them African-American - were caught in a Neo-Nazi rally in the Czech Republic, putting their lives in danger. The police found the band members and provided them with a safe house and passage to Kraków, Poland.

Discography

As leader/co-leader

As sideperson

References

External links
Official site
Mike Reed: Jazz Timekeeper, Rock Tastemaker at NPR Music

1974 births
Living people
Jazz drummers
Musicians from Evanston, Illinois
University of Dayton alumni
21st-century drummers
RogueArt artists